Katharine Lady Berkeley's School is an academy school near Wotton-under-Edge, Gloucestershire, England, for ages 11 to 18.

History
The school was founded by Katherine, Lady Berkeley for the use of six scholars in 1384 which makes it one of the oldest surviving schools in England. It is known that schools existed in the area before then, but Lady Berkeley formalised this school, gaining it a Royal license and it became a model for other schools. The first headteacher was John Stone M.A.

The old school buildings in School Lane, Wotton-under-Edge, were erected in 1726 with additions later. Shortly after the school had become co-educational, Church Mill was bought in 1908. After the First World War, Carlton House was rented from the Post Office.

New buildings 

In January 1963, the school vacated the premises in Wotton and moved into a new building for 350 pupils in the Kingswood Road. The erection of the first phase of extensions to the Kingswood Road buildings began in March 1972. The extensions were completed for the start of the Autumn Term 1973, when Katharine Lady Berkeley's re-opened as a comprehensive school for 830 pupils. Wotton Secondary School closed at the end of August 1973.

In 1984 the six hundredth anniversary of the foundation of the school was celebrated with a visit from Princess Anne. In 1989, the Duke of Gloucester opened the Renishaw Centre, an IT room costing £60,000 and since then the School has installed three more computer rooms. The Renishaw Company renewed the equipment in the Renishaw Centre.

In 1992, grant-maintained (GM) status was attained, with the object of providing for the structural improvement of the buildings and a wish to be able to make independent decisions to suit the school's future. In 1996, the school achieved designation as a Language College. This enabled the school to offer a languages curriculum covering seven modern languages and Latin.

In 1994, accommodation was added to allow for the increase in numbers, from 1,010 in 1984 to 1,170 in 1994 and then to 1,340 in 1998. Further new buildings were completed in September 1997 to provide six more classrooms and the Language Centre costing £220,000 was opened in September 1996. In autumn 1999, work began on further new buildings to provide a new two storey teaching block which includes 11 classrooms, three ICT suites and a new library. In addition to this a three laboratory extension was added to the Science Centre. In 2007, the school gained a second DfES specialism, that of training school. The school population has stabilized at around 1500 pupils. In September 2011, the school became an academy. Since then the Science block has had 8 of its 11 rooms completely remade and several new classrooms have been added.  In 2021 the school won a bid for an extensive rebuild with the designs finalised in early 2022.

Notable former pupils
 William Tyndale, scholar
 Edward Jenner, physician and scientist
 Mathew Blagden Hale, Anglican bishop
Adjoa Andoh, Actor
 Catherine Johnson, playwright
 Simon Mason, England hockey goalkeeper
 Sean Rigg, professional footballer
 Ben Morgan, England rugby union player

References

External links

Educational institutions established in the 14th century
1384 establishments in England
Secondary schools in Gloucestershire
Academies in Gloucestershire
Training schools in England
Wotton-under-Edge